Nike Total 90 is a brand of Nike sportswear and equipment first introduced in 2000, designed to be used for association football. The range consists mainly of football boots, and kits, but also includes balls, shin guards, goalkeeper gloves and other items. The Nike Total 90 range was replaced with the Nike Hypervenom.

Overview
The Total 90 Laser III version is the most complex of the line of boots. It features five red silicone pads that are designed to improve the strike zone, as well as TPU fins that are designed to enhance touch and control.

In September 2011, Nike revealed the latest incarnation of their signature power/accuracy boots; the Nike T90 Laser IV. This latest incarnation did away with the silicon pods and TPU rubber fins of the Laser III, and introduced 'strips' of hard rubber to the forefoot which shift and bend with the movements of the foot - with Nike coining the name 'Adaptive Shield' for this new technology. The Laser IV also features TPU swerve fins to generate friction and ball spin, and a Power Zone that improves strength and accuracy when striking the ball.

With the launch of the Nike T90 Laser IV, Nike were also keen to re-invent the silo for the modern striker.

Launched in two colourways, White/Black/Total Orange and Black/Silver/Yellow, the Nike T90 Laser IV hit the pitch early when Wesley Sneijder wore them in Inter Milan's clash with Palermo at the start of the 2011-12 Serie A season.

The boot's official on-pitch debut was on 18 September 2011, when Wayne Rooney wore them in Manchester United's Premier League match against Chelsea.

See also
 Nike Tiempo range, Nike ‘Touch’ boot
 Nike CTR360 range, Nike 'Control' boot
 Nike Mercurial range, Nike ‘Speed’ boot
 Nike Hypervenom range, Nike 'Agility' boot

References

Nike football boots
Total 90